The 1987–88 European Cup was the 23rd edition of the European Cup, the International Ice Hockey Federation (IIHF)'s premier European club ice hockey tournament. The season started on October 8, 1987, and finished on October 16, 1988.  The tournament was won by CSKA Moscow, capturing their eleventh straight title and eighteenth overall.

Preliminary round

Group round

Group A
(Megève, France)

Group A standings

Group B
(Varese, Italy)

Group B standings

Group C
(Oslo, Norway)

Group C standings

Group D
(Rotterdam, Netherlands)

Group D standings

Final Group
(Davos, Graubünden, Switzerland)

Final group standings

References
 Season 1988

1987–88 in European ice hockey
IIHF European Cup